The Babylon Bend Bridge is one of nine metal highway bridges in Fulton County, Illinois listed on the National Register of Historic Places and still standing. This bridge was built in 1890 over the Spoon River and is located along Illinois Route 123 near Ellisville. It was added to the National Register of Historic Places on October 29, 1980, along with the eight other bridges, as one of the "Metal Highway Bridges of Fulton County. Some of the other bridges included the now demolished Duncan Mills Bridge in Lewistown and the Indian Ford Bridge in London Mills, Illinois. In total, six of the nine bridges have been destroyed.

Notes

External links
 Babylon Bend on Bridgehunter.com

Road bridges on the National Register of Historic Places in Illinois
Bridges in Fulton County, Illinois
Bridges completed in 1890
National Register of Historic Places in Fulton County, Illinois
Metal bridges in the United States
Truss bridges in the United States